The 5th Parliament of Singapore was a meeting of the Parliament of Singapore. It commenced its first and only session on 3 February 1981 and was dissolved on 4 December 1984.

The members of the 5th Parliament were elected in the 1980 general election. Parliament was controlled by a People's Action Party majority, led by Prime Minister Lee Kuan Yew and his Cabinet. The Speaker was Dr Yeoh Ghim Seng.

Officeholders 

 Speaker: Yeoh Ghim Seng (PAP)
 Deputy Speaker: Hwang Soo Jin (PAP)
 Prime Minister: Lee Kuan Yew (PAP)
 Deputy Prime Minister:
 Goh Keng Swee (PAP)
 S. Rajaratnam (PAP)
 Leader of the House: Edmund W. Barker (PAP)
 Leader of the Opposition: J. B. Jeyaretnam (WP), from 31 October 1981
 Party Whip of the People's Action Party: Lee Yiok Seng

Composition

Members 
This is the list of members of the 5th Parliament of Singapore elected in the 1980 general election.

Changes in members

By-elections

Vacant seats

References 

Parliament of Singapore